Rossend Perelló i Casellas (Gironella, 1912 — Barcelona, 13 April 1976) was a Catalan writer. 

He took part in several literature contests. He had three children with his wife Maria Assumpta Losa Ortiz de Arril: Maria Rosa, Esperança and Carles.

Prizes
Flor Natural, Jocs Florals de Montblanc, 1956
Premi Joan Santamaria, 1960, Bob, fanalet vermell.

Works

Poetry 
 L'enyor i les noces (1935)
 Camí de Maria (1948)
 Bonics (1952)

Novel 
 El president signa els dimarts (1954)

Theatre
 Tres de servei (1958)

References

External links
  "Goigs a la Mare de Déu de l'Incendi" de Rossend Perelló

1912 births
1976 deaths
People from Berguedà
Writers from Catalonia